Lalbagh, also spelled Lal Bagh is a term in Hindustani and Persian language. Its meanings include "red garden" and "beloved garden".

Lalbagh or Lal Bagh may refer to:

 Lalbagh, Mangalore, a city in India
 Lal Bagh, an old botanical garden in Bangalore, India
 Lalbagh metro station, a station serving the Basavanagudi area of Bangalore
 Lalbagh Fort, a 17th-century Mughal fort complex in Dhaka, Bangladesh
 Lalbagh Thana, a neighborhood in Dhaka
 Lalbagh Palace, a residence of the Holkar Maharajah in Indore, Madhya Pradesh, India

See also  
 Lal Bagh Express, a train in India
 Lalbag subdivision
 Lalbag Court Road railway station, a station in West Bengal, India
 Lal, an Indo-Iranian surname and given name
 Bāgh (garden), an enclosed garden with trees as well as flowers

Persian words and phrases